Bohdanovce is a village and municipality in Košice-okolie District in the Kosice Region of eastern Slovakia.

Genealogical resources

The records for genealogical research are available at the state archive "Statny Archiv in Kosice, Slovakia"

 Reformated church records (births/marriages/deaths): 1728-1899 (parish A)

See also
 List of municipalities and towns in Slovakia

External links

Surnames of living people in Bohdanovce

Villages and municipalities in Košice-okolie District